East Central High School may refer to:

East Central High School (Indiana) — Saint Leon, Indiana
East Central High School (Minnesota) — Sandstone, Minnesota
East Central High School (Mississippi) — Moss Point, Mississippi
East Central High School (Oklahoma) — Tulsa, Oklahoma
East Central High School (Texas) — San Antonio, Texas